Trichodes similis is a beetle species of checkered beetles belonging to the family Cleridae, subfamily Clerinae. It was described by Ernst Gustav Kraatz in 1894 and is endemic to Greece.

References

similis
Beetles described in 1894
Endemic fauna of Greece